The women's snowboard cross event in snowboarding at the 2006 Winter Olympics was held in Bardonecchia, a village in the Province of Turin, Italy. Competition took place on 17 February 2006.

Medalists

Results

Qualification

All competitors raced two qualification runs, with only the better of the two times used in the final ranking. The top 16 of the 23 competitors advanced to the quarter-finals. Struck-through runs in the table below represent the discarded time for a competitor.

Elimination round
The top 16 qualifiers advanced to the quarterfinal round. From here, they participated in four-person elimination races, with the top two from each race advancing.

Quarterfinals

Quarterfinal 1

Quarterfinal 2

Quarterfinal 3

Quarterfinal 4

Semifinals

Semifinal 1

Semifinal 2

Finals

The four semifinalists who failed to advanced to the big final competed in the small final to determine 5th through 8th places. The four last place finishers in the quarterfinals contested a 13th-16th classification race, while the third-placed finishers raced for 9th through 13th.

In the large final, American Lindsey Jacobellis had a clear lead heading to the final hill, but failed in an unnecessary attempt at a twisting grab in the air, falling and allowing Tanja Frieden to sweep past her and claim the gold medal.

Large Final

Small Final

Classification 9-12

Classification 13-16

References

Snowboarding at the 2006 Winter Olympics
2006 in women's sport
Women's events at the 2006 Winter Olympics